Chaplain (Major General) Douglas Lanier Carver, USA (born September 10, 1951) is a retired American Army officer who served as the 22nd Chief of Chaplains of the United States Army. He was appointed to this assignment on July 12, 2007 and was the first Southern Baptist chaplain to be promoted to the position of Chief of Chaplains in more than 50 years.

Career
Carver holds theology degrees from the University of Tennessee and the Southern Baptist Theological Seminary.

He was originally commissioned in the field artillery and served with the 4th Infantry Division as a company grade officer in various artillery positions.  He left active duty, but served with the Army Reserve for five additional years.

Upon returning to active duty in 1984, he attended the Chaplain Corps officer basic course and began his career in the chaplaincy. Before serving as Deputy Chief of Chaplains in September 2005, he was director of training at the Chaplain Center and School at Fort Jackson, South Carolina.  He was also a senior chaplain for V Corps and Combined Joint Task Force 7 in Germany and Iraq from 2002 through 2004. In his current position as Director of Chaplaincy with the North American Mission Board (the endorsing agent for the Southern Baptist Convention), he is responsible for overseeing 2,700 chaplains around the world.

Awards and decorations

Gallery

See also
Armed Forces Chaplains Board
Chiefs of Chaplains of the United States

References 

Southern Baptist ministers
United States Army generals
Recipients of the Distinguished Service Medal (US Army)
Recipients of the Legion of Merit
University of Tennessee alumni
1951 births
Living people
Chiefs of Chaplains of the United States Army
Deputy Chiefs of Chaplains of the United States Army
Southern Baptist Theological Seminary alumni